was a Japanese table tennis player, coach, president of the ITTF and former World No. 1 who won 12 World Championship titles during his career. Ogimura was also a key figure in the Ping Pong Diplomacy events of the early 1970s, as well as being instrumental in Korea playing as a unified team at the 1991 World Table Tennis Championships.

Early life
Ogimura was born in Itō, Shizuoka, in 1932. His father died when Ogimura was two years old and his mother often worked too late to take care of him.

Ogimura began playing table tennis in April 1948 as a student at Metropolitan Tenth Junior High School, where he was a student. At the age of 16, Ogimura started practicing the sport at the Musashino table tennis hall, run by Hisae Uehara, in Kichijoji, Tokyo.

He later enrolled in the Tokyo Metropolitan University and, in 1953 he transferred on a scholarship to Tengaku Nihon University's Faculty of Arts, Department of Films.

Table tennis career
He won the All-Japan National Championships and represented Japan at the World Championships. He won 12 world titles at the Championships including men's singles in 1954 and 1956, together with 5 consecutive titles in the team competitions.

He also won three English Open titles.

Retirement
After his retirement, Ogimura coached overseas in Sweden, China and USA. He got involved in the Japanese Olympic Committee  and Japan Table Tennis Association. He became an executive member of the International Table Tennis Federation in 1973 and president in 1987. In 1994, Ogimura died of lung cancer; he was survived by his wife, a son and two daughters. He was inducted into the ITTF Hall of Fame in 1997.

The "Ping-pong Diplomat" 
Ichiro Ogimura was a key figure in the “Ping-pong Diplomacy” of the early 1970s, and has been called “a giant of sports diplomacy” and garnered the nickname, the “Ping-pong Diplomat.”

While the meeting of Glenn Cowan and Zhuang Zedong is often used as the catalyst for the “Ping Pong Diplomacy” movement, Ogimura had already been working behind the scenes to arrange for China’s return to the international table tennis scene. On Ogimura’s insistence, Chinese Premier, Zhou Enlai, allowed the Chinese national team to take part in the 1971 World Table Tennis Championships in Nagoya, Japan. It was at this tournament where Cowen and Zedong had their chance meeting, an event which led to the meeting of President Nixon and Chairman Mao.

The “highlight of Ogimura’s table tennis diplomacy” was his work in leading North Korea and South Korea to play as a unified Korean team at the 1991 World Table Tennis Championships in Chiba, Japan. Prior to the championships, Ogimura “visited South Korea 20 times and traveled to North Korea 15 times to plead for a unified team from the Korean peninsula. Ogimura worked with local Japanese government heads to create joint training camps in the cities of Nagano, Nagaoka in Niigata Prefecture, and Chiba, and secured agreement from the ITTF for North Korea and South Korea to compete under the unified name of “Korea” – the first such occurrence since the Korean War.

The unified Korean team played under a white flag depicting the Korean peninsula in blue, and used the Korean folksong, Arirang, rather than a national anthem of the North or the South. The competition saw the Korean team win one gold medal, one silver and two bronze medals.

Ichiro Ogimura also served as the Japanese goodwill ambassador to the United Kingdom in 1954.

Playing Style 
The "Fifty-One Percent Doctrine” was a playing style invented and popularised by Ogimura. It encouraged an aggressive playing style whereby a smash shot would be risked by a player if they believed they had a 51% or higher chance of defeating the opponent with it. This style was later adopted by world champions such as Zhuang Zedong and Stellan Bengtsson, to both of whom Ogimura served as a coach and mentor.

Equipment 

Ogimura was active in the development of table tennis equipment, designing a shoe especially designed for table tennis for Japanese footwear brand, Koyo Bear. In Britain, the shoes were marketed in cooperation with the table tennis equipment brand  and co-branded with the Joola logo.

See also
 List of table tennis players
 List of World Table Tennis Championships medalists

References

1932 births
1994 deaths
Japanese male table tennis players
Japanese table tennis coaches
Asian Games medalists in table tennis
Sportspeople from Shizuoka Prefecture
Nihon University alumni
Table tennis players at the 1958 Asian Games
Table tennis players at the 1962 Asian Games
Asian Games gold medalists for Japan
Asian Games silver medalists for Japan
Asian Games bronze medalists for Japan
Medalists at the 1958 Asian Games
Medalists at the 1962 Asian Games
Recipients of the Medal with Purple Ribbon
Presidents of the International Table Tennis Federation